The 2013 Conference USA Football Championship Game, which determined the 2013 football champion of Conference USA (C-USA), was played at noon Eastern Standard Time (11 am local time and 1700 UTC) on December 7 at Rice Stadium in Houston. The game featured the winners of the conference's East division, the Marshall Thundering Herd, and the winners of the West division, the Rice Owls.

Under C-USA rules, the championship game would be played at the home stadium of the team with the best record in conference play. Since Marshall and Rice both finished with 7–1 records in conference play, and did not play one another in the regular season, the site was chosen based on the BCS rankings on December 1. Although only 25 teams are explicitly ranked, the ranking formula can be used to determine the relative rankings of any two teams in the Football Bowl Subdivision. Accordingly, Rice received home-field advantage.

Rice represented C-USA in the 2013 Liberty Bowl on December 31 in Memphis, Tennessee after defeating Marshall by 17 points.

History
In the 2012 Championship Game Tulsa defeated former conference member UCF (University of Central Florida) in overtime, 33–27 in Tulsa, Oklahoma.

After the 2013 Conference USA realignment, C-USA added six new members for the 2013 season after losing four members, including UCF, to the American Athletic Conference.

After the 2013 season, the ninth C-USA championship game was played in Houston, Texas for the third time since 2011, when the Houston Cougars hosted the Southern Miss Golden Eagles at Robertson Stadium. It was the first time that Rice Stadium hosted the Championship game series after Rice became the winner of the West Division.

Teams

West Division Champions

Rice came into the championship with a non–conference record of 2–2 after losing to Texas A&M and former C-USA member Houston and beating Kansas and New Mexico State. Rice was second in the West Division behind Tulane until Rice lost to North Texas, falling into third place. Tulane lost their two conference games in November, which moved Rice back up to second behind North Texas, until North Texas lost to UTSA. Rice then became ranked first in the division. At the end of the regular 2013 season, Rice had to defeat Tulane in order to be crowned the winners of the West Division, or Tulane or UTSA would have been crowned winners of the division. Rice defeated Tulane 17–13 to win the division.

This was Rice's first appearance in Conference USA Championship series.

East Division Champions

Marshall came into the championship with a non–conference record of 2–2 after losing to Ohio and Virginia Tech and beating Miami(OH) and Gardner–Webb. Marshall was behind East Carolina in second in the East Division standings until East Carolina lost to Tulane, moving Marshall up to first in the standings. Marshall then lost a close game to Middle Tennessee 49–51, which dropped Marshall behind East Carolina for the rest of the season until the East Carolina–Marshall game in late November. In order for Marshall to be crowned the winners of the East Division, Marshall. Marshall beat East Carolina 59–28 to win the East Division.

This was Marshall's first appearance in the Conference USA Championship series.

Scoring summary

Statistics

References

Championship
Conference USA Football Championship Game
Marshall Thundering Herd football games
Rice Owls football games
Sports competitions in Houston
December 2013 sports events in the United States
2013 in sports in Texas
2013 in Houston